Edward Charles Aspatore (June 23, 1909 – March 14, 1986) was a player in the National Football League.

Biography
Aspatore was born on June 23, 1909 in Fond du Lac, Wisconsin.

Career
Aspatore played with Cincinnati Reds during the 1934 NFL season as a guard and tackle. Prior to the NFL, he played collegiately at Marquette University.

References

1909 births
1986 deaths
Cincinnati Reds (NFL) players
Marquette Golden Avalanche football players
Sportspeople from Fond du Lac, Wisconsin
Players of American football from Wisconsin